Gloria Izaguirre (born August 15, 1966 in Mexico City, Mexico) is a Mexican actress.

Filmography

Television
Como dice el dicho (2012) ....  Anabel 
Cachito de cielo (2012) .... Bernarda
Una familia con suerte (2011) .... Yesenia
Mujeres Asesinas (2010) .... Special participation
Niña de mi corazón (2010) Special participation
Atrévete a soñar (2009-2010) .... Petra
Adictos (2009) .... Federica
Lola, érase una vez (2007) .... Macrina Vicenta Torres
La fea más bella (2006-2007) .... Juanita
Bajo el mismo techo (2005) .... Teacher
El juego de la vida (2001-2002).... Profesora Maura
Rencor apasionado (1998) .... Cholita
Mujer, casos de la vida real (1997/2007)
Sentimientos ajenos (1996) .... Samy
María la del Barrio (1995) .... Marcela
Valentina (1993) .... Rosita
Carrusel de las Américas (1992)
Cadenas de amargura (1991) .... Carmelita Ríos
Papá soltero (1989) .... Carmelita (episode "Propósitos de año nuevo")
Dulce desafío (1988) .... Irene
Cicatrices del alma (1986) .... Corina
Chiquilladas (1985) .... Laura
Cachún cachún ra ra! (1985-1987) .... Reven

External links
 

1966 births
Living people
Mexican film actresses
Mexican television actresses
Actresses from Mexico City